is a junction railway station in Aoba-ku, Sendai in Miyagi Prefecture, Japan, operated by East Japan Railway Company (JR East) and the Sendai Subway. The subway and JR lines are not directly connected, however, the distance between the two stations is only around one hundred metres.

Lines

Station layout

Kita-Sendai Station has a single aboveground island platform serving JR East, and a single underground island platform serving the Sendai Subway. The JR East portion of the station has a Midori no Madoguchi staffed ticket office.

JR East platforms

Sendai Subway platforms

History
Kita-Sendai Station opened on 29 September 1929. The station became part of the JR East network with the privatization of Japanese National Railways (JNR) on 1 April 1987. The Sendai Subway station opened on 15 July 1987.

Passenger statistics
In fiscal 2018, the JR East portion of the station was used by an average of 4,825 passengers daily (boarding passengers only). In fiscal 2015, the Sendai Subway portion of the station was used by an average of 8,510 passengers daily.

Surrounding area
Sendai City Martial Arts Hall & Aoba Gymnasium
Kita-Sendai Post Office
Aoba Shrine
Kamisugiyama Junior High School

See also
 List of railway stations in Japan

References

External links

 (JR East) 
 (Sendai Subway) 

Stations of East Japan Railway Company
Railway stations in Sendai
Sendai Subway Namboku Line
Senzan Line
Railway stations in Japan opened in 1929